Kristina "Kristi" Curry Rogers (born June 20, 1974) is an American vertebrate paleontologist and a professor in Biology and Geology at Macalester College.  Her research focuses on questions of dinosaur paleobiology, bone histology, growth, and evolution, especially in a subgroup of sauropods called Titanosauria. She has named two dinosaur species from Madagascar, Rapetosaurus, the most complete Cretaceous sauropod and titanosaur found to date, and Vahiny, so far known only from a partial skull.  She and Jeffrey A. Wilson co-authored The Sauropods, Evolution and Paleobiology, published in December 2005. Her research includes field work in Argentina, Madagascar, Montana, South Africa, and Zimbabwe.

Early life and education 

Rogers was born in Sikeston, Missouri, where her passion for paleontology was fostered at an early age. By the time she began research during her undergraduate education under the guidance of Jack Horner, her future career in research was fossilized. Her experience ignited a long-term fascination with the long-necked, giant dinosaurs known as sauropods. She graduated with a degree in Biology from Montana State University in 1996.    

Rogers completed both her MSc and PhD in Anatomical Sciences from State University of New York at Stony Brook. by 2001. Her graduate advisors, Catherine Forster and David W. Krause, were founding members of the Mahajanga Basin Project, a long-term, National Science Foundation and National Geographic Society-supported research program focused on the Upper Cretaceous Maevarano Formation.    

Her graduate research focused on the evolutionary history of Titanosauria.  Since then, she has continued to publish work elucidating titanosaur anatomy and paleobiology.

Career 
In 2001, Rogers was hired as the Curator of Paleontology at the Science Museum of Minnesota, where she worked until 2008. At that time, she moved to Macalester College, where she was jointly appointed in the Biology and Geology Departments. In 2019, she was appointed as Chair of Biology at Macalester College.    

She is also an active member of the Society of Vertebrate Paleontology, the Geological Society of America, and the Society for Integrative Comparative Biology.

Awards and honours 
Rogers has been the recipient of a number of National Science Foundation grants, including the prestigious NSF CAREER award.  Rogers was awarded the Macalester College Jack and Marty Rossman Excellence in Teaching Award in 2015.

Rogers has also served as an on screen expert for numerous  documentaries with the BBC, PBS, the National Geographic Channel, and the Discovery Channel, and is featured in the large format film Titanosaur 3D: The Story of Maximo.  She was also a guest speaker on the MPR News in 2012 where she discussed dinosaur bones and has starred in a video describing the way in which dinosaurs grow.

Family 
She is married to Macalester College geologist, Ray Rogers, and has two daughters.

Partial bibliography 

 
 Castanet, J., K. Curry Rogers, J. Cubo, and J. J. Boisard. 2000. Quantification of periosteal osteogenesis in ostrich and emu: Implications for studies of extinct dinosaurian bone histology. Comptes Rendus l'Académie des Sciences.
 
 
 Curry Rogers, K. 2001. "Growth Rates among the dinosaurs" in The Scientific American Book of Dinosaurs (Paul, G., ed.). pp. 297–309.
 Rogers, R.R., D.W. Krause, and K. Curry Rogers. (2003). Cannibalism in the Madagascan dinosaur Majungatholus atopus. Nature. 422:515-518.
 Curry Rogers, K and Forster, C. A. (2004) The skull of Rapetosaurus krausei (Sauropoda: Titanosauria) from the Late Cretaceous of Madagascar. Journal of Vertebrate Paleontology 24(1): 121–143.
 Rogers, R.R., K. Curry Rogers, D. Munyikwa, R. Terry, and B. Singer. (2004). New insights into Karoo-equivalent rocks in the Limpopo Valley of Zimbabwe, with observations on the preservation of early dinosaurs. Journal of African  Earth Sciences, 40:147-161.
 Curry Rogers, K. A., (2005), "Titanosauria: A Phylogenetic Overview" in Curry Rogers and Wilson (eds), The Sauropods: Evolution and Paleobiology pp. 50–103
 Krause, D. W., P. M. O’Connor, K. Curry Rogers, S. Sampson, G. Buckley, and R. R. Rogers. (2006). Late Cretaceous Terrestrial Vertebrates from Madagascar: Implications for Latin American Biogeography. Annals of the Missouri Botanical Garden 93:178-208.
 Salgado, L., R. A. Coria, C. M. Magalhaes Ribeiro, A. Garrido, R. Rogers, M. E. Simón, A. B. Arcucci, K. Curry Rogers, A.P. Carabajal, S. Apesteguía, M. Fernández, R. A. García, and M. Talevi. (2007). Upper Cretaceous dinosaur nesting sites of Río Negro (Salitral Ojo de Agua and Salinas de Trapalcó-Salitral de Santa Rosa), northern Patagonia, Argentina. Cretaceous Research 28:392-404.
 Rogers, R. R., D. W. Krause, K. Curry Rogers, A. H. Rasoamiaramanana, and L. Rahantarisoa. (2007). Paleoenvironment and Paleoecology of Majungasaurus crenatissimus (Theropoda: Abelisauridae) from the Late Cretaceous of Madagascar. Journal of Vertebrate Paleontology Memoir 8 27(suppl. to 2):21-31.
 Erickson, G. M., K. Curry Rogers, D. J. Varricchio, M. A. Norell, and Xing Xu. (2007). Growth patterns in brooding dinosaurs reveal the timing of sexual maturity in non-avian dinosaurs and genesis of the avian condition. Biological Letters 3:558-561.
 Wilson, J. A., M. D. D’emic, K. Curry Rogers, D. M. Mohabey, and S. Sen. (2009). Reassessment of the sauropod dinosaur Jainosaurus (= “Antarctosaurus”) septentrionalis from the Upper Cretaceous of India. Contributions from the University of Michigan Museum of Paleontology 32:17-40.
 Curry Rogers, K. (2009). The postcranial anatomy of Rapetosaurus krausei (Sauropoda: Titanosauria). Journal of Vertebrate Paleontology 29:1046-1086.
 Stein, K., Z. Csiki, K. Curry Rogers, D. B. Weishampel, R. Redelstorff, J. L. Carballido, and P. M. Sander. (2010). Small body size and extreme cortical bone remodeling indicate phyletic dwarfism in Magyarosaurus dacus (Sauropoda: Titanosauria). Proceedings of the National Academy of  Science 107: 9258-9263.
 
 Wilson, J. A. and K. Curry Rogers. (2012). The Sauropods, in M. Brett-Surman, T. Holtz, Jr., and J. O. Farlow (eds.), The Complete Dinosaur, Second Edition. Indiana University Press, Bloomington: 444-481.
 Curry Rogers, K. and M. D’Emic. (2012). Triumph of the Titans. Scientific American 306(5): 48-55.
 Curry Rogers, K. and J. A. Wilson. (2014). Vahiny depereti gen. et sp. nov., a new titanosaur from the Upper Cretaceous Maevarano Formation, Madagascar. Journal of Vertebrate Paleontology 34: 606-617.
 
 Curry Rogers, K., M. Whitney, M. D’Emic, and B. Bagley. (2016). Precocity in a tiny titanosaur from the Late Cretaceous of Madagascar. Science 352:450-454.
 Rogers, R. R., M. Carrano, K. Curry Rogers, M. Perez, and A. Regan. (2017). Isotaphonomy in concept and practice: an exploration of vertebrate microfossil bonebeds in the Upper Cretaceous (Campanian) Judith River Formation, north-central Montana. Paleobiology 43:248-273.

Books
 
Reviews:

References

External links 
 
 
 
 Kristi Curry Rogers – Macalester College Geology Department
 She studies dinos in Madagascar Questions and answers about Curry Rogers' research from Science Museum of Minnesota visitors.
 Skeleton of New Dinosaur "Titan" Found in Madagascar – D.L. Parsell – National Geographic News, August 1, 2001
 
 www.nationalgeographic.com/science/article/r-is-for-rapetosaurus
 

Living people
1974 births
American paleontologists
Women paleontologists
Stony Brook University alumni
Macalester College faculty